Marbury School was a private non-denominational co-educational R-12 progressive school located in the Adelaide Hills at Aldgate, South Australia. Marbury was conceived as an incorporated non-profit association with a Board of Governors, who declared at the school’s outset that it was a "co-educational, non-sectarian, independent, non-competitive, non-authoritarian school".

The name is a portmanteau of Margaret (Edhouse/Langley), Burwell (Dodd), and Harry (Edhouse) who were the original founders.  Margaret was the Principal, and the Dodds provided much of the capital to purchase the grounds.

It was a small school, with one class per year, and only about 15 students per class.  In the early 1990s there were roughly about 150 students.  Marbury was hugely honoured in 1991 when one of their long time students received the best score for a South Australian year 12 student.  Another longtime student of Marbury School, who is now famously successful, is the musician Sia.

In the period 1972-2004, the school was located at 160 Mount Barker Road, Aldgate, in the property that was also known as Wairoa, Aldgate, and surrounding properties. A portion of the property has since been purchased by The Hills Montessori school, where their secondary (or "Wairoa") campus is located. The original mansion and historic gardens have continued in private ownership.

The school's main building (Wairoa) appears as the home of Col. and Mrs. Fitzhubert in the iconic Australian film Picnic at Hanging Rock.

References

 https://web.archive.org/web/20111206091331/http://www.privateschoolsguide.com/view-user-profile/marbury-school-aldgate-sa.html
 Marbury School 1971-2004: How did it start, why did it finish? Internet Archive Mirror
 Marbury film, 1988 part 1;  part 2

Private primary schools in Adelaide
High schools in South Australia
Educational institutions established in 1971
Educational institutions disestablished in 2004